This is a list of premiers of Manitoba in order of time served in office as premier of Manitoba as of . The preceding premier always stays in office during an election campaign, and that time is included in the total.

Notes

Manitoba

Premiers
Premiers